Frank Tolles Chamberlin (March 10, 1873 - July 24, 1961) was an American painter, muralist, sculptor, and art teacher.

He studied at the Art Students League with George DeForest Brush and George Bridgman.
He taught for four years at the Beaux Arts Institute of Design, and spent summers at the MacDowell (artists' residency and workshop).

He taught at the Otis Institute, in 1921, as a founding faculty member at the Chouinard Art Institute, and at the University of Southern California School of Architecture. His work was part of the sculpture event in the art competition at the 1932 Summer Olympics.

In 1918, he married Katharine Beecher Stetson, the only daughter of artist Charles Walter Stetson and writer/feminist Charlotte Perkins Gilman.

Exhibitions
 1913 New York Architectural League
 1914 Boston Architectural Club, Massachusetts
 1916 The MacDowell Club, New York
 1921 Painters & Sculptors of Los Angeles
 1922 Sculptors Guild of Southern California
 1929, 1945 California Palace of the Legion of Honor
 1934 Public Works of Art Project
 1935 Academy of Western Painters, Los Angeles
 1939 GGIE
 1940 California Watercolor Society
 1942 University of Redlands, California
 1947 Jepson Art Institute
 1955 Pasadena Art Museum retrospective

Awards
 1911 Rome Prize
 1935 2nd prize, Academy of Western Painters (LA)
 1936 James Ackley McBride Award, Pasadena Society of Artists
 1940 Logan Medal of the Arts, Los Angeles Branch of Society for Sanity in Art

References

External links
Chamberlin, Frank Tolles (San Francisco, 1873 - Pasadena, 1961)
"Frank Tolles Chamberlain (American, 1873-1961)", Artnet
The Peabody Art Collection 

American muralists
19th-century American painters
American male painters
20th-century American painters
1873 births
1961 deaths
Artists from San Francisco
Artists from New Rochelle, New York
20th-century American sculptors
19th-century American sculptors
19th-century American male artists
American male sculptors
National Sculpture Society members
MacDowell Colony fellows
Sculptors from California
Sculptors from New York (state)
Olympic competitors in art competitions
20th-century American male artists